The Men's 400 metres event  at the 2011 European Athletics Indoor Championships was held on March 4 & 5 with the final being held on March 5 at 17:45 local time.

Records

Results

Heats
First 2 in each heat and 2 best performers advanced to the Semifinals. The heats were held at 10:45.

Semifinals 
First 3 in each heat advanced to the Final. The semifinals were held at 18:10.

Final 
The final was held at 17:45.

References 

400 metres at the European Athletics Indoor Championships
2011 European Athletics Indoor Championships